Rob Payne  is a Canadian novelist.

Payne is married and lives in Perth, Australia with his wife and daughter.

He is the author of three dramatic-comedy novels for adults, and two science fiction, comedy-adventure novels for young adults. He is also known for his work as a writer and/or editor for such publications as The Globe and Mail, Canadian Fiction, Front and Centre and Quarry.

How to Be a Hero on Earth 5 was nominated for the 2007 White Pine Award.

Bibliography
Live By Request - (2002)
Working Class Zero - (2003)
Sushi Daze - (2005)
How to Be a Hero on Earth 5 - (2006)
 How to Save the Universe Again - (2007)

Essays
The Brisbane International Arts Festival

References

External links

Canadian science fiction writers
Canadian male novelists
Place of birth missing (living people)
Year of birth missing (living people)
Canadian magazine editors
Living people